Listing of the diverse vegetation types of South Africa that have been sampled, classified, described, and mapped by the SANBI VEGMAP project. Vegetation types of Lesotho and Eswatini are included in the project. The vegetation map is useful for biodiversity assessment, research, conservation management and environmental planning, and includes a database. The project is ongoing as more data becomes available over time. The first map was published in 2006, and has been updated in 2009. 2012 and 2018.

The classification system uses a hierarchy to organise the vegetation types within the nine defined biomes and a tenth azonal group. Bioregions are described within the biomes, and the vegetation types are at the more detailed level, and represent groups of communities with similar biotic and abiotic features. The vegetation types are plotted on the map in as much resolution as is available using a GIS system.

Mapping of the distribution and extent of natural vegetation of South Africa started in 1918 when the Botanical Survey of the Union of South Africa was established. Maps by Pole-Evans (1936), Acocks (1953), and Low and Rebelo (1996) preceded the current system, which is the combined effort of participants from various centres in the country.

Listed by biome:

Savanna 
88 Savanna vegetation types, code SV:

 Andesite Mountain Bushveld (SVcb 11)
 Aoub Duneveld (SVkd 3)
 Barberton Serpentine Sourveld (SVl 13)
 Bhisho Thornveld (SVs 7)
 Cathedral Mopane Bushveld (SVmp 3)
 Central Sandy Bushveld (SVcb 12)
 Delagoa Lowveld (SVl 4)
 Dwaalboom Thornveld (SVcb 1)
 Dwarsberg-Swartruggens Mountain Bushveld (SVcb 4)
 Eastern Valley Bushveld (SVs 6)
 Gabbro Grassy Bushveld (SVl 6)
 Gauteng Shale Mountain Bushveld (SVcb 10)
 Ghaap Plateau Vaalbosveld (SVk 7)
 Gold Reef Mountain Bushveld (SVcb 9)
 Gordonia Duneveld (SVkd 1)
 Gordonia Kameeldoring Bushveld (SVkd 2)
 Gordonia Plains Shrubland (SVk 16)
 Granite Lowveld (SVl 3)
 Gravelotte Rocky Bushveld (SVl 7)
 Kaalrug Mountain Bushveld (SVl 12)
 Kathu Bushveld (SVk 12)
 Kimberley Thornveld (SVk 4)
 Koranna-Langeberg Mountain Bushveld (SVk 15)
 Kuruman Mountain Bushveld (SVk 10)
 Kuruman Thornveld (SVk 9)
 Kuruman Vaalbosveld (SVk 8)
 KwaZulu-Natal Hinterland Thornveld (SVs 3)
 KwaZulu-Natal Sandstone Sourveld (SVs 5)
 Lebombo Summit Sourveld (SVl 17)
 Legogote Sour Bushveld (SVl 9)
 Limpopo Ridge Bushveld (SVmp 2)
 Limpopo Sweet Bushveld (SVcb 19)
 Loskop Mountain Bushveld (SVcb 13)
 Loskop Thornveld (SVcb 14)
 Lowveld Rugged Mopaneveld (SVmp 6)
 Madikwe Dolomite Bushveld (SVcb 2)
 Mafikeng Bushveld (SVk 1)
 Makatini Clay Thicket (SVl 21)
 Makhado Sweet Bushveld (SVcb 20)
 Makuleke Sandy Bushveld (SVl 1)
 Malelane Mountain Bushveld (SVl 11)
 Mamabolo Mountain Bushveld (SVcb 24)
 Marikana Thornveld (SVcb 6)
 Molopo Bushveld (SVk 11)
 Moot Plains Bushveld (SVcb 8)
 Mopane Basalt Shrubland (SVmp 4)
 Mopane Gabbro Shrubland (SVmp 8)
 Musina Mopane Bushveld (SVmp 1)
 Ngongoni Veld (SVs 4)
 Norite Koppies Bushveld (SVcb 7)
 Northern Lebombo Bushveld (SVl 15)
 Northern Zululand Sourveld (SVl 22)
 Nossob Bushveld (SVkd 4)
 Nwambyia-Pumbe Sandy Bushveld (SVl 2)
 Ohrigstad Mountain Bushveld (SVcb 26)
 Olifantshoek Plains Thornveld (SVk 13)
 Phalaborwa-Timbavati Mopaneveld (SVmp 7)
 Pilanesberg Mountain Bushveld (SVcb 5)
 Polokwane Plateau Bushveld (SVcb 23)
 Postmasburg Thornveld (SVk 14)
 Poung Dolomite Mountain Bushveld (SVcb 25)
 Pretoriuskop Sour Bushveld (SVl 10)
 Roodeberg Bushveld (SVcb 18)
 Schmidtsdrif Thornveld (SVk 6)
 Schweizer-Reneke Bushveld (SVk 3)
 Sekhukhune Mountain Bushveld (SVcb 28)
 Sekhukhune Plains Bushveld (SVcb 27)
 South Eastern Coastal Thornveld (SVs 8)
 Southern Lebombo Bushveld (SVl 16)
 Soutpansberg Mountain Bushveld (SVcb 21)
 Springbokvlakte Thornveld (SVcb 15)
 Stella Bushveld (SVk 2)
 Swaziland Sour Bushveld (SVl 14)
 Tembe Sandy Bushveld (SVl 18)
 Thukela Thornveld (SVs 2)
 Thukela Valley Bushveld (SVs 1)
 Tsende Mopaneveld (SVmp 5)
 Tshokwane-Hlane Basalt Lowveld (SVl 5)
 Tzaneen Sour Bushveld (SVl 8)
 Vaalbos Rocky Shrubland (SVk 5)
 VhaVenda Miombo (SVcb 22)
 Waterberg Mountain Bushveld (SVcb 17)
 Western Maputaland Clay Bushveld (SVl 20)
 Western Maputaland Sandy Bushveld (SVl 19)
 Western Sandy Bushveld (SVcb 16)
 Zeerust Thornveld (SVcb 3)
 Zululand Coastal Thornveld (SVl 24)
 Zululand Lowveld (SVl 23)

Grassveld 
73 Grassveld vegetation types, code G:

 Aliwal North Dry Grassland (Gh 2)
 Amathole Mistbelt Grassland (Gd 2)
 Amathole Montane Grassland (Gd 1)
 Amersfoort Highveld Clay Grassland (Gm 13)
 Barberton Montane Grassland (Gm 17)
 Basotho Montane Shrubland (Gm 5)
 Bedford Dry Grassland (Gs 18)
 Besemkaree Koppies Shrubland (Gh 4)
 Bloemfontein Dry Grassland (Gh 5)
 Bloemfontein Karroid Shrubland (Gh 8)
 Carletonville Dolomite Grassland (Gh 15)
 Central Free State Grassland (Gh 6)
 Drakensberg Afroalpine Heathland (Gd 10)
 Drakensberg Foothill Moist Grassland (Gs 10)
 Drakensberg-Amathole Afromontane Fynbos (Gd 6)
 East Griqualand Grassland (Gs 12)
 Eastern Free State Clay Grassland (Gm 3)
 Eastern Free State Sandy Grassland (Gm 4)
 Eastern Highveld Grassland (Gm 12)
 Egoli Granite Grassland (Gm 10)
 Frankfort Highveld Grassland (Gm 6)
 Income Sandy Grassland (Gs 7)
 Ithala Quartzite Sourveld (Gs 2)
 KaNgwane Montane Grassland (Gm 16)
 Karoo Escarpment Grassland (Gh 1)
 Klerksdorp Thornveld (Gh 13)
 KwaZulu-Natal Highland Thornveld (Gs 6)
 Leolo Summit Sourveld (Gm 20)
 Lesotho Highland Basalt Grassland (Gd 8)
 Low Escarpment Moist Grassland (Gs 3)
 Lydenburg Montane Grassland (Gm 18)
 Lydenburg Thornveld (Gm 21)
 Mabela Sandy Grassland (Gs 13)
 Midlands Mistbelt Grassland (Gs 9)
 Mooi River Highland Grassland (Gs 8)
 Mthatha Moist Grassland (Gs 14)
 Northern Drakensberg Highland Grassland (Gd 5)
 Northern Escarpment Afromontane Fynbos (Gm 24)
 Northern Escarpment Dolomite Grassland (Gm 22) 
 Northern Escarpment Quartzite Sourveld (Gm 23) 
 Northern Free State Shrubland (Gm 7) 
 Northern KwaZulu-Natal Moist Grassland (Gs 4) 
 Northern KwaZulu-Natal Shrubland (Gs 5) 
 Northern Zululand Mistbelt Grassland (Gs 1) 
 Paulpietersburg Moist Grassland (Gm 15) 
 Queenstown Thornveld (Gs 16) 
 Rand Highveld Grassland (Gm 11) 
 Sekhukhune Montane Grassland (Gm 19) 
 Senqu Montane Shrubland (Gm 2) 
 Southern Drakensberg Highland Grassland (Gd 4) 
 Southern KwaZulu-Natal Moist Grassland (Gs 11)
 Soutpansberg Summit Sourveld (Gm 28)
 Soweto Highveld Grassland (Gm 8)
 Steenkampsberg Montane Grassland (GM 30)
 Stormberg Plateau Grassland (Gd 3)
 Strydpoort Summit Sourveld (Gm 27)
 Tarkastad Montane Shrubland (Gs 17)
 Tsakane Clay Grassland (Gm 9)
 Tsomo Grassland (Gs 15)
 uKhahlamba Basalt Grassland (Gd 7)
 Vaal Reefs Dolomite Sinkhole Woodland (Gh 12)
 Vaal-Vet Sandy Grassland (Gh 10)
 Vredefort Dome Granite Grassland (Gh 11)
 Wakkerstroom Montane Grassland (Gm 14)
 Waterberg-Magaliesberg Summit Sourveld (Gm 29)
 Western Free State Clay Grassland (Gh 9)
 Western Highveld Sandy Grassland (Gh 14)
 Western Lesotho Basalt Shrubland (Gd 9)
 Winburg Grassy Shrubland (Gh 7)
 Wolkberg Dolomite Grassland (Gm 26)
 Woodbush Granite Grassland (Gm 25)
 Xhariep Karroid Grassland (Gh 3)
 Zastron Moist Grassland (Gm 1)

Fynbos 
81 Fynbos vegetation types, code FF:

 Agulhas Limestone Fynbos (FFl 1) 
 Agulhas Sand Fynbos (FFd 7) 
 Albertinia Sand Fynbos (FFd 9) 
 Algoa Sandstone Fynbos (FFs 29)
 Atlantis Sand Fynbos (FFd 4) 
 Bokkeveld Sandstone Fynbos (FFs 1) 
 Boland Granite Fynbos (FFg 2) 
 Breede Alluvium Fynbos (FFa 2) 
 Breede Quartzite Fynbos (FFq 4) 
 Breede Sand Fynbos (FFd 8) 
 Breede Shale Fynbos (FFh 4) 
 Canca Limestone Fynbos (FFl 3) 
 Cape Flats Sand Fynbos (FFd 5) 
 Cape Winelands Shale Fynbos (FFh 5) 
 Cederberg Sandstone Fynbos (FFs 4) 
 Central Coastal Shale Band Vegetation (FFb 4) 
 Central Inland Shale Band Vegetation (FFb 3) 
 De Hoop Limestone Fynbos (FFl 2) 
 Eastern Coastal Shale Band Vegetation (FFb 6) 
 Eastern Inland Shale Band Vegetation (FFb 5) 
 Elgin Shale Fynbos (FFh 6) 
 Elim Ferricrete Fynbos (FFf 1) 
 Garden Route Granite Fynbos (FFg 5) 
 Garden Route Shale Fynbos (FFh 9) 
 Graafwater Sandstone Fynbos (FFs 2) 
 Greyton Shale Fynbos (FFh 7) 
 Grootrivier Quartzite Fynbos (FFq 5) 
 Hangklip Sand Fynbos (FFd 6) 
 Hawequas Sandstone Fynbos (FFs 10) 
 Hopefield Sand Fynbos (FFd 3) 
 Kamiesberg Granite Fynbos (FFg 1) 
 Kango Conglomerate Fynbos (FFt 1) 
 Knysna Sand Fynbos (FFd 10) 
 Kogelberg Sandstone Fynbos (FFs 11) 
 Kouebokkeveld Alluvium Fynbos (FFa 1) 
 Kouebokkeveld Shale Fynbos (FFh 1) 
 Kouga Grassy Sandstone Fynbos (FFs 28) 
 Kouga Sandstone Fynbos (FFs 27) 
 Leipoldtville Sand Fynbos (FFd 2) 
 Loerie Conglomerate Fynbos (FFt 2) 
 Lourensford Alluvium Fynbos (FFa 4) 
 Matjiesfontein Quartzite Fynbos (FFq 3) 
 Matjiesfontein Shale Fynbos (FFh 2) 
 Montagu Shale Fynbos (FFh 8) 
 Namaqualand Sand Fynbos (FFd 1) 
 North Hex Sandstone Fynbos (FFs 7) 
 North Kammanassie Sandstone Fynbos (FFs 25) 
 North Langeberg Sandstone Fynbos (FFs 15) 
 North Outeniqua Sandstone Fynbos (FFs 18) 
 North Rooiberg Sandstone Fynbos (FFs 21) 
 North Sonderend Sandstone Fynbos (FFs 13)? 
 North Swartberg Sandstone Fynbos (FFs 23) 
 Northern Inland Shale Band Vegetation (FFb 1) 
 Olifants Sandstone Fynbos (FFs 3) 
 Overberg Sandstone Fynbos (FFs 12) 
 Peninsula Granite Fynbos (FFg 3) 
 Peninsula Sandstone Fynbos (FFs 9) 
 Piketberg Sandstone Fynbos (FFs 6) 
 Potberg Ferricrete Fynbos (FFf 2) 
 Potberg Sandstone Fynbos (FFs 17) 
 Robertson Granite Fynbos (FFg 4) 
 South Hex Sandstone Fynbos (FFs 8) 
 South Kammanassie Sandstone Fynbos (FFs 26) 
 South Langeberg Sandstone Fynbos (FFs 16) 
 South Outeniqua Sandstone Fynbos (FFs 19) 
 South Rooiberg Sandstone Fynbos (FFs 22) 
 South Sonderend Sandstone Fynbos (FFs 14) 
 South Swartberg Sandstone Fynbos (FFs 24) 
 Southern Cape Dune Fynbos (FFd 11) 
 Stinkfonteinberge Quartzite Fynbos (FFq 1) 
 Suurberg Quartzite Fynbos (FFq 6) 
 Suurberg Shale Fynbos (FFh 10) 
 Swartberg Altimontane Sandstone Fynbos (FFs 31) 
 Swartberg Shale Fynbos (FFh 3) 
 Swartland Alluvium Fynbos (FFa 3) 
 Swartruggens Quartzite Fynbos (FFq 2) 
 Swellendam Silcrete Fynbos (FFc 1) 
 Tsitsikamma Sandstone Fynbos (FFs 20) 
 Western Altimontane Sandstone Fynbos (FFs 30) 
 Western Coastal Shale Band Vegetation (FFb 2) 
 Winterhoek Sandstone Fynbos (FFs 5)

Renosterveld 
29 Renosterveld vegetation types, code FR:

 Baviaanskloof Shale Renosterveld (FRs 18) 
 Breede Alluvium Renosterveld (FRa 1) 
 Breede Shale Renosterveld (FRs 8) 
 Central Mountain Shale Renosterveld (FRs 5) 
 Central Ruêns Shale Renosterveld (FRs 12) 
 Ceres Shale Renosterveld (FRs 4) 
 Eastern Ruêns Shale Renosterveld (FRs 13) 
 Hantam Plateau Dolerite Renosterveld (FRd 2) 
 Humansdorp Shale Renosterveld (FRs 19) 
 Kango Limestone Renosterveld (FRl 1) 
 Langkloof Shale Renosterveld (FRs 17) 
 Matjiesfontein Shale Renosterveld (FRs 6) 
 Montagu Shale Renosterveld (FRs 7) 
 Mossel Bay Shale Renosterveld (FRs 14) 
 Namaqualand Granite Renosterveld (FRg 1) 
 Nieuwoudtville Shale Renosterveld (FRs 2) 
 Nieuwoudtville-Roggeveld Dolerite Renosterveld (FRd 1) 
 Peninsula Shale Renosterveld (FRs 10) 
 Robertson Granite Renosterveld (FRg 3) 
 Roggeveld Shale Renosterveld (FRs 3) 
 Ruêns Silcrete Renosterveld (FRc 2) 
 Swartberg Shale Renosterveld (FRs 15) 
 Swartland Alluvium Renosterveld (FRa 2) 
 Swartland Granite Renosterveld (FRg 2) 
 Swartland Shale Renosterveld (FRs 9) 
 Swartland Silcrete Renosterveld (FRc 1) 
 Uniondale Shale Renosterveld (FRs 16) 
 Vanrhynsdorp Shale Renosterveld (FRs 1) 
 Western Ruêns Shale Renosterveld (FRs 11)

Succulent Karoo 
65 Succulent Karoo vegetation types, code SK:

 Aggeneys Gravel Vygieveld (SKr 19) 
 Agter-Sederberg Shrubland (SKv 3) 
 Anenous Plateau Shrubland (SKr 15) 
 Bushmanland Inselberg Shrubland (SKr 18) 
 Central Knersvlakte Vygieveld (SKk 2) 
 Central Richtersveld Mountain Shrubland (SKr 1) 
 Citrusdal Vygieveld (SKk 7) 
 Die Plate Succulent Shrubland (SKr 10) 
 Doringrivier Quartzite Karoo (SKv 1) 
 Eastern Little Karoo (SKv 11) 
 Eenriet Plains Succulent Shrubland (SKr 17) 
 Goariep Mountain Succulent Shrubland (SKr 3) 
 Hantam Karoo (SKt 2) 
 Kamiesberg Mountains Shrubland (SKn 6) 
 Klawer Sandy Shrubland (SKs 13) 
 Knersvlakte Dolomite Vygieveld (SKk 6) 
 Knersvlakte Quartz Vygieveld (SKk 3) 
 Knersvlakte Shale Vygieveld (SKk 4) 
 Koedoesberge-Moordenaars Karoo (SKv 6) 
 Kosiesberg Succulent Shrubland (SKr 12) 
 Lekkersing Succulent Shrubland (SKr 4) 
 Little Karoo Quartz Vygieveld (SKv 10) 
 Namaqualand Arid Grassland (SKs 11) 
 Namaqualand Blomveld (SKn 3) 
 Namaqualand Coastal Duneveld (SKs 8) 
 Namaqualand Heuweltjie Strandveld (SKs 14) 
 Namaqualand Heuweltjieveld (SKn 4) 
 Namaqualand Inland Duneveld (SKs 9) 
 Namaqualand Klipkoppe Shrubland (SKn 1) 
 Namaqualand Shale Shrubland (SKn 2) 
 Namaqualand Spinescent Grassland (SKs 12) 
 Namaqualand Strandveld (SKs 7) 
 Northern Knersvlakte Vygieveld (SKk 1) 
 Northern Richtersveld Scorpionstailveld (SKr 7) 
 Northern Richtersveld Yellow Duneveld (SKs 2) 
 Oograbies Plains Sandy Grassland (SKs 6) 
 Piketberg Quartz Succulent Shrubland (SKk 8) 
 Platbakkies Succulent Shrubland (SKn 5) 
 Prince Albert Succulent Karoo (SKv 13) 
 Richtersveld Coastal Duneveld (SKs 1) 
 Richtersveld Red Duneveld (SKs 5) 
 Richtersveld Sandy Coastal Scorpionstailveld (SKs 4) 
 Riethuis-Wallekraal Quartz Vygieveld (SKs 10) 
 Robertson Karoo (SKv 7) 
 Roggeveld Karoo (SKt 3) 
 Rooiberg Quartz Vygieveld (SKr 11) 
 Rosyntjieberg Succulent Shrubland (SKr 8) 
 Southern Namaqualand Quartzite Klipkoppe Shrubland (SKk 10) 
 Southern Richtersveld Inselberg Shrubland (SKr 14) 
 Southern Richtersveld Scorpionstailveld (SKr 13) 
 Southern Richtersveld Yellow Duneveld (SKs 3) 
 Steytlerville Karoo (SKv 14) 
 Stinkfonteinberge Eastern Apron Shrubland (SKr 6) 
 Swartruggens Quartzite Karoo (SKv 2) 
 Tanqua Escarpment Shrubland (SKv 4) 
 Tanqua Karoo (SKv 5) 
 Tatasberg Mountain Succulent Shrubland (SKr 9) 
 Umdaus Mountains Succulent Shrubland (SKr 16) 
 Upper Annisvlakte Succulent Shrubland (SKr 2) 
 Vanrhynsdorp Gannabosveld (SKk 5) 
 Vyftienmyl se Berge Succulent Shrubland (SKr 5) 
 Western Bushmanland Klipveld (SKt 1) 
 Western Gwarrieveld (SKv 9) 
 Western Little Karoo (SKv 8) 
 Willowmore Gwarrieveld (SKv 12)

Albany Thickets and Strandveld 
54 Albany thickets and Strandveld vegetation types, codes AT and FS:

 Albany Arid Thicket (AT 15) – Also known as Albany Spekboomveld, and shown on the 2012 VEGMAP as AT8 Kowie Thicket. Albany Arid Thicket occurs  in  the  Eastern  Cape  Province. The type location is a steep, arid, north facing slope north of Grahamstown. It is a low thicket vegetation type of about 2m height dominated by succulent shrubs and woody karroid shrubs with occasional trees and emergent succulent trees. The soils are mainly argillaceous (clay) of the Ecca and Dwyka groups, at altitudes from 254 to 521m above sea level. Land type is Fb, mainly tillites. Rainfall is non-seasonal, typically from 475 to 521mm per year, with occasional frost higher up the slopes, and snow may fall in winter. Mean monthly maximum temperature is 27°C in February and mean monthly minimum 6°C in July. Albany Arid Thicket is the most species rich South African arid thicket type. Characteristic species include: Aloe ferox, Aloe speciosa (endemic), Boscia oleoides(endemic), Commiphora harveyi, Crassula ovata(endemic), Digitaria eriantha, Encephalartos trispinosus (endemic), Euclea undulata, Euphorbia bothae (endemic), Euphorbia tetragona (endemic),  Pappea  capensis, Portulacaria afra, Ptaeroxylon obliquum, Rhigozum obovatum, Strelitzia reginae. There is no data on threat level and the vegetation type is poorly protected.
 Albany Bontveld (AT 16) — A vegetation type from the Eastern Cape Province, on flat-topped hills between the southern end of the Ecca Pass and Table Hill, to the north and northeast of Grahamstown.
 Albany Mesic Thicket (AT 17) 
 Albany Valley Thicket (AT 18) 
 Baviaans Valley Thicket (AT 19) 
 Bethelsdorp Bontveld (AT 20) 
 Blombos Strandveld (FS 8) 
 Buffels Mesic Thicket (AT 21) 
 Buffels Valley Thicket (AT 22) 
 Cape Flats Dune Strandveld (FS 6) 
 Crossroads Grassland Thicket (AT 23) 
 Doubledrift Karroid Thicket (AT 24) 
 Eastern Gwarrieveld (AT 25) 
 Elands Forest Thicket (AT 26) 
 Escarpment Arid Thicket (AT 27) 
 Escarpment Mesic Thicket (AT 28) 
 Escarpment Valley Thicket (AT 29) 
 Fish Arid Thicket (AT 30) 
 Fish Mesic Thicket (AT 31) 
 Fish Valley Thicket (AT 32) 
 Gamka Arid Thicket (AT 33) 
 Gamka Valley Thicket (AT 34) 
 Geluk Grassland Thicket (AT 35) 
 Goukamma Dune Thicket (AT 36) 
 Gouritz Valley Thicket (AT 37) 
 Grahamstown Grassland Thicket (AT 38) 
 Grassridge Bontveld (AT 39) 
 Groot Brak Dune Strandveld (FS 9) 
 Hamburg Dune Thicket (AT 56) 
 Hartenbos Dune Thicket (AT 40) 
 Kasouga Dune Thicket (AT 41) 
 Koedoeskloof Karroid Thicket (AT 42) 
 Lambert’s Bay Strandveld (FS 1) 
 Langebaan Dune Strandveld (FS 5) 
 Mons Ruber Fynbos Thicket (AT 43) 
 Motherwell Karroid Thicket (AT 44) 
 Nanaga Savanna Thicket (AT 45) 
 Oudshoorn Karroid Thicket (AT 46) 
 Overberg Dune Strandveld (FS 7) 
 Saldanha Flats Strandveld (FS 3) 
 Saldanha Granite Strandveld (FS 2) 
 Saldanha Limestone Strandveld (FS 4) 
 Saltaire Karroid Thicket (AT 47) 
 Sardinia Forest Thicket (AT 48) 
 St Francis Dune Thicket (AT 57) 
 Subtropical Dune Thicket (AZs 3) 
 Sundays Arid Thicket (AT 49) 
 Sundays Mesic Thicket (AT 50) 
 Sundays Valley Thicket (AT 51) 
 Thorndale Forest Thicket (AT 52) 
 Umtiza Forest Thicket (AT 53) 
 Vanstadens Forest Thicket (AT 54) 
 Western Gwarrieveld (AT 55) 
 Willowmore Gwarrieveld (AT 58)

Nama Karoo and desert 
29 Nama Karoo and desert vegetation types, codes NK and D:

 Albany Broken Veld (NKl 4) 
 Blouputs Karroid Thornveld (NKb 2) 
 Bushmanland Arid Grassland (NKb 3) 
 Bushmanland Basin Shrubland (NKb 6) 
 Bushmanland Sandy Grassland (NKb 4) 
 Eastern Lower Karoo (NKl 2) 
 Eastern Upper Karoo (NKu 4) 
 Gamka Karoo (NKl 1) 
 Kalahari Karroid Shrubland (NKb 5) 
 Lower Gariep Broken Veld (NKb 1) 
 Lower Karoo Gwarrieveld (NKl 3) 
 Northern Upper Karoo (NKu 3) 
 Upper Karoo Hardeveld (NKu 2) 
 Western Upper Karoo (NKu 1) 
 Alexander Bay Coastal Duneveld (Dn 1) 
 Eastern Gariep Plains Desert (Dg 9) 
 Eastern Gariep Rocky Desert (Dg 10) 
 Helskloof Canyon Desert (Dg 6) 
 Kahams Mountain Desert (Dg 5) 
 Kwaggarug Mountain Desert (Dg 4) 
 Namib Lichen Fields (Dn 2) 
 Noms Mountain Desert (Dg 1) 
 Northern Nababiepsberge Mountain Desert (Dg 7) 
 Richtersberg Mountain Desert (Dg 2) 
 Richtersveld Sheet Wash Desert (Dg 3) 
 Southern Nababiepsberge Mountain Desert (Dg 8) 
 Western Gariep Hills Desert (Dn 5) 
 Western Gariep Lowland Desert (Dn 4) 
 Western Gariep Plains Desert (Dn 3)

Azonal 
35 Azonal vegetation types, code AZ:

 Albany Alluvial Vegetation (AZa 6) 
 Albany Dune Strandveld (AZs 2) 
 Algoa Dune Strandveld (AZs 1) 
 Arid Estuarine Salt Marshes (AZe 1) 
 Bushmanland Vloere (AZi 5) 
 Cape Estuarine Salt Marshes (AZe 2) 
 Cape Inland Salt Pans (AZi 9) 
 Cape Lowland Alluvial Vegetation (AZa 2) 
 Cape Lowland Freshwater Wetlands (AZf 1) 
 Cape Seashore Vegetation (AZd 3) 
 Cape Vernal Pools (AZf 2) 
 Drakensberg Wetlands (AZf 4) 
 Eastern Temperate Freshwater Wetlands (AZf 3) 
 Fynbos Riparian Vegetation (AZa 1) 
 Highveld Alluvial Vegetation (AZa 5) 
 Highveld Salt Pans (AZi 10) 
 Lesotho Mires (AZf 5) 
 Lower Gariep Alluvial Vegetation (AZa 3) 
 Muscadel Riviere (AZi 8) 
 Namaqualand Riviere (AZi 1) 
 Namaqualand Salt Pans (AZi 2) 
 Namaqualand Seashore Vegetation (AZd 2) 
 Namib Seashore Vegetation (AZd 1) 
 Southern Kalahari Mekgacha (AZi 3) 
 Southern Kalahari Salt Pans (AZi 4) 
 Southern Karoo Riviere (AZi 6) 
 Subantarctic Kelp Bed Vegetation (Azm 2) 
 Subtropical Alluvial Vegetation (AZa 7) 
 Subtropical Dune Thicket (AZs 3) 
 Subtropical Estuarine Salt Marshes (AZe 3) 
 Subtropical Freshwater Wetlands (AZf 6) 
 Subtropical Salt Pans (AZi 11) 
 Subtropical Seashore Vegetation (AZd 4) 
 Tanqua Wash Riviere (AZi 7) 
 Upper Gariep Alluvial Vegetation (AZa 4)

Forest and coastal belt 
17 Forest and coastal belt vegetation types, codes FO and CB

 KwaZulu-Natal Coastal Belt (CB 3) 
 Maputaland Coastal Belt (CB 1) 
 Maputaland Wooded Grassland (CB 2) 
 Pondoland-Natal Sandstone Coastal Sourveld (CB 4) 
 Transkei Coastal Belt (CB 5) 
 Ironwood Dry Forest (FOz 9) 
 Lowveld Riverine Forest (FOa 1) 
 Mangrove Forest (FOa 3) 
 Northern Afrotemperate Forest (FOz 2) 
 Northern Coastal Forest (FOz 7) 
 Northern Mistbelt Forest (FOz 4) 
 Sand Forest (FOz 8) 
 Scarp Forest (FOz 5) 
 Southern Afrotemperate Forest (FOz 1) 
 Southern Coastal Forest (FOz 6) 
 Southern Mistbelt Forest (FOz 3) 
 Swamp Forest (FOa 2)

Subantarctic 
8 Subantarctic vegetation types, code ST:

 Subantarctic Biotic Herbfield and Grassland (ST 2) 
 Subantarctic Cinder Cone Vegetation (ST 7) 
 Subantarctic Coastal Vegetation (ST 1) 
 Subantarctic Drainage Line Vegetation (ST 4) 
 Subantarctic Fellfield (ST 6) 
 Subantarctic Fernbrake Vegetation (ST 5) 
 Subantarctic Mire (ST 3) 
 Subantarctic Polar Desert (PD 1)

References

Biodiversity of South Africa
Ecology